Doctor Dolittle may refer to:

Doctor Dolittle, the central character of a series of 14 books written by Hugh Lofting between 1920 and 1952
Doctor Dolittle (1967 film), a 1967 Rex Harrison film musical
Doctor Dolittle (TV series), a 1970 DePatie-Freleng animated television series
Doctor Dolittle (musical), a 1998 stage musical with book, music and lyrics by Leslie Bricusse, based on the 1967 movie
Dolittle (film), a 2020 film primarily based on The Voyages of Doctor Dolittle

or, a series of films remaking the 1967 original:

Dr. Dolittle (1998 film), a 1998 film starring Eddie Murphy
Dr. Dolittle 2, a 2001 sequel to the 1998 film and Eddie Murphy's last in the series
Dr. Dolittle 3, a 2006 direct-to-video (DTV) sequel starring Kyla Pratt, the original daughter throughout the series
Dr. Dolittle: Tail to the Chief, a 2008 direct-to-video (DTV) sequel
Dr. Dolittle: Million Dollar Mutts, a 2009 direct-to-video (DTV) sequel

See also
Dolittle (programming language)
Doolittle (disambiguation)